Lauretta Vivian Lamptey is a former Ghanaian Commissioner on Human Rights and Administrative Justice. She is a lawyer and an investment banker.

Education
Lauretta Lamptey studied law at the University of Ghana, Legon where she gained the LL. B. She continued to the Ghana Law School, where she qualified as a barrister. She also studied international business law at the London School of Economics and Political Science of the University of London, where she acquired the LL. M. degree.

Work
Lauretta Lamptey has worked in various capacities. She has been the head of the Capital Markets Group at Ecobank Ghana. She moved from there to become head of corporate finance at Cal Merchant Bank. She is also known to have provided legal, financial and investment advice to the Government of Ghana on transactions related to mining, energy and natural resources. She is on the board of directors of the Ghana Commercial Bank. She has also been on the Securities Discount Company (SDC) and Gliksten W. A. and is a founder member of the board of the Ghana Stock Exchange.

Commission on Human Rights and Administrative Justice
Lauretta was sworn in as the Commissioner on 26 July 2011 by President John Atta Mills. Her appointment proved popular with gender activists including Adjoa Bame of NETRIGHT. She was removed in November 2015 by President Mahama following investigations by the Chief Justice of Ghana following allegations made against her.

References

External links
Facebook page

Ghanaian women lawyers
Ghanaian bankers
University of Ghana alumni
Alumni of the London School of Economics
Living people
Year of birth missing (living people)
21st-century Ghanaian lawyers